Club Atlético Sarmiento is an Argentine sports club based in Junín, Buenos Aires Province, Argentina. The club currently competes in Primera División, the top division of the Argentine football league system.

Founded in 1911 and affiliated to AFA in 1952, Sarmiento has only played 3 seasons in the Primera División, in 1981, 1982 and 2015. The team best final position ever was 13th in 1981, being relegated to the last place in 1982.

Players

Current squad
As of 17 September 2022

Source: Argentine Soccer

Out on loan

Honours
B Nacional (1): 2020
Primera B (3): 1980, 2003–04, 2011–12
Primera C (1): 1977

References

External links

 
 Sentimiento Verde (fan site) 

 
Association football clubs established in 1911
1911 establishments in Argentina
Football clubs in Buenos Aires Province